A "burn notice" is an official statement issued by an intelligence agency to other agencies. It states that an asset or intelligence source is unreliable for one or several reasons, often fabrication, and must be officially disavowed. This is essentially a directive for the recipient to disregard or "burn" all information derived from that individual or group.

Examples
 Ahmed Chalabi
 Curveball—"The CIA has since issued an official 'burn notice' formally retracting more than 100 intelligence reports based on his information."
 Manucher Ghorbanifar—1984 and 1986. "The CIA considered Ghorbanifar a dangerous con man and had issued a 'burn notice' recommending that no U.S. agency have any dealings with him."
 Ali Abdel Saoud Mohamed, who was recruited by the CIA and immediately revealed himself to be a double agent.  "The CIA issued a burn notice to U.S. and allied intelligence services that Mohamed was not to be trusted."

In popular culture
 The USA Network television series Burn Notice centers on Michael Westen (portrayed by Jeffrey Donovan), a former covert operative who has been burned and is trying to find those responsible.
 In the season 1 episode of Archer "Job Offer", Malory Archer puts out a burn notice on her son Sterling Archer after he accepts a job with competing intelligence agency ODIN, which was then made to look like an ODIN false flag operation.

 In the 1966-1973 CBS Network television series Mission Impossible and the Mission: Impossible (film series) the IMF leader is given a secret recorded message explaining the mission, followed by a disclaimer to the effect of "should you or any of your team be caught or killed the secretary will disavow any knowledge of your actions."

See also
Fabricator (intelligence)

References

Espionage